Peter Harper may refer to:

 Peter Harper (American artist) (born 1974), American sculptor, singer and songwriter
 Peter Harper (alternative technologist), originator of the term 'Alternative Technology'
 Peter Harper (cricketer) (born 1977), Australian cricketer
 Sir Peter Harper (geneticist) (born 1939), Welsh geneticist
 Peter Harper (musician) (born 1968), Australian-American musician, singer and songwriter
 Peter Harper (racing driver) (1921–2003), British racing driver